Veža may refer to:

 Mladen Veža, a Croatian painter
 Dleskovec Plateau, a plateau in Slovenia